The VRC Champions Stakes, registered as the LKS Mackinnon Stakes, is a Victoria Racing Club Group 1 Thoroughbred horse race run under Weight for Age conditions over a distance of 2000 metres at Flemington Racecourse in Melbourne, Australia on the last day of the Melbourne Cup Carnival, the Saturday after the Melbourne Cup. Total prize money is A$3,000,000.

History 
The race is named after a former chairman of the Victoria Racing Club, Lauchlan Kenneth Scobie ("L.K.S.") MacKinnon (1861–1935). It was originally held on the first day of the Melbourne Cup Carnival, Victoria Derby Day. In 2016, the VRC moved the race as the feature of the last day of the carnival, and moved the Cantala Stakes (the then feature of the last day of the carnival and at the time known as the Emirates Stakes) to the first day of the carnival. After the swap, the race would be known as simply the Emirates Stakes until 2017.

Prior to 2016, many horses with a ranking high enough to avoid the ballot for the Melbourne Cup used the race as a lead-in to the 3,200 metre Cup, run on the first Tuesday in November (otherwise they race in the longer Hotham Handicap). The VRC believed that placing the race on the last day of the Melbourne Cup Carnival would attract quality horses, that raced in the W. S. Cox Plate, to run at the distance, rather than using the race to prepare for the Melbourne Cup. In 2022, the race was renamed the VRC Champions Stakes in order to align with the branding of the entire race day, which is now called Champions Day (which also features rebranded Cantala Stakes and VRC Stakes) instead of Stakes Day.

Name 
The race was the predecessor to the Turnbull Stakes.
1869–1936 - Melbourne Stakes
1937–1986 - LKS Mackinnon Stakes
1987–1989 - Occidental Mackinnon Stakes
1990 - LKS Mackinnon Stakes
1991–2000 - Louis Vuitton Mackinnon Stakes
2001–2004 - Thrifty Mackinnon Stakes
2005–2006 - Motorola Mackinnon Stakes
2007 - L'Oreal Paris Mackinnon Stakes
2008 - Crown Mackinnon Stakes
2009 - LKS Mackinnon Stakes
2010–2015 - Longines Mackinnon Stakes
2016–2017 - Emirates Stakes
2018–2020 - Seppelt Mackinnon Stakes
2021  - Paramount+ Mackinnon Stakes
2022– - TAB Champions Stakes

Distance 
1869–1971 - 1 miles (~2000 metres)
1972 onwards -  2000 metres

Grade 
1869–1978 -  Principal Race
1979 onwards - Group 1

Doubles wins 
The following thoroughbreds have won the LKS MacKinnon Stakes – Melbourne Cup in the same year.
 Malua (1884), Carbine (1890), Phar Lap (1930), Peter Pan (1932, 1934), The Trump (1937), Comic Court (1950), Delta (1951), Dalray (1952), Rising Fast (1954), Rain Lover (1968), At Talaq (1986), Empire Rose (1988), Let's Elope (1991), Rogan Josh (1999)

Winners since 2000

Earlier winners

 1999 - Rogan Josh
 1998 - Champagne
 1997 - Ebony Grosve
 1996 - All Our Mob
 1995 - Danewin
 1994 - Paris Lane
 1993 - The Phantom
 1992 - Veandercross
 1991 - Let's Elope
 1990 - Better Loosen Up
 1989 - Horlicks
 1988 - Empire Rose
 1987 - Rubiton
 1986 - At Talaq
 1985 - Rising Prince
 1984 - Bounty Hawk
 1983 - Veloso      
 1982 - My Axeman
 1981 - Belmura Lad
 1980 - Belmura Lad
 1979 - Dulcify
 1978 - Family Of Man
 1977 - Silver Lad
 1976 - Gold and Black
 1975 - Kiwi Can
 1974 - Leilani
 1973 - Australasia
 1972 - Stormy Seas
 1971 - Skint Dip
 1970 - Voleur
 1969 - Roman Consul
 1968 - Rain Lover
 1967 - Winfreux
 1966 - Tobin Bronze
 1965 - Yangtze
 1964 - Sir Dane
 1963 - Summer Fair
 1962 - Aquanita
 1961 - Sky High
 1960 - Tulloch
 1959 - Trellios
 1958 - Monte Carlo
 1957 - Sailor's Guide
 1956 - Sir William
 1955 - Rising Fast
 1954 - Rising Fast
 1953 - Hydrogen
 1952 - Dalray
 1951 - Delta
 1950 - Comic Court
 1949 - Comic Court
 1948 - Snowstream
 1947 - Don Pedro
 1946 - Flight
 1945 - Tranquil Star
 1944 - Tranquil Star
 1943 - Amana
 1942 - Tranquil Star
 1941 - Beau Vite
 1940 - Beau Vite
 1939 - Ortelle's Star
 1938 - Ajax
 1937 - The Trump

Melbourne Stakes (1869–1936)

 1936 - Gay Blonde
 1935 - Sylvandale
 1934 - Peter Pan
 1933 - Rogilla
 1932 - Peter Pan
 1931 - Phar Lap
 1930 - Phar Lap
 1929 - High Syce
 1928 - Gothic
 1927 - Silvius
 1926 - Manfred
 1925 - Pilliewinkie
 1924 - Gloaming
 1923 - Rivoli
 1922 - Harvest King
 1921 - Eurythmic
 1920 - Eurythmic
 1919 - Cetigne
 1918 - Magpie
 1917 - Cetigne
 1916 - Lavendo
 1915 - Traquette
 1914 - St. Carwyne
 1913 - Anna Carlovna
 1912 - Duke Foote
 1911 - Trafalgar
 1910 - Son Of The Marsh
 1909 - Alawa
 1908 - Peru
 1907 - Poseidon
 1906 - Solution
 1905 - Tartan
 1904 - Gladsome
 1903 - Wakeful
 1902 - Wakeful
 1901 - Wakeful
 1900 - Lancaster
 1899 - Mora
 1898 - Battalion
 1897 - Battalion
 1896 - Disfigured
 1895 - Hova
 1894 - Ruenalf
 1893 - Loyalty
 1892 - Autonomy
 1891 - Marvel
 1890 - Carbine
 1889 - Abercorn
 1888 - The Australian Peer
 1887 - Silver Mine
 1886 - Isonomy
 1885 - Trenton
 1884 - Malua
 1883 - Commotion
 1882 - Darebin
 1881 - Wheatear
 1880 - Chester
 1879 - First King
 1878 - Chester
 1877 - Robinson Crusoe
 1876 - Rapid Bay
 1875 - Kingsborough
 1874 - Dagworth
 1873 - Dagworth
 1872 - Contessa
 1871 - Warrior
 1870 - Tim Whiffler
 1869 - Glencoe

* The 1932 race was a dead-heat and has joint winners.

1946 &1954 racebooks

See also
 List of Australian Group races
 Group races

References

Open middle distance horse races
Group 1 stakes races in Australia
Flemington Racecourse